Slovenia competed at the 2020 Summer Paralympics in Tokyo, Japan, from 24 August to 5 September 2021.

Medalists

Cycling 

Slovenia sent one male cyclist after successfully getting a slot in the 2018 UCI Nations Ranking Allocation quota for the European.

Shooting 

Two Slovenian shooters will competed after qualified. They are shooters name is Franc Pinter (Men's 10m Air Rifle Standing SH1) & Franček Gorazd Tiršek (Mixed 10m Air Rifle Standing SH2).

Swimming 

One Slovenian swimmer has successfully entered the paralympic slot after breaking the MQS.

References 

2020
Nations at the 2020 Summer Paralympics
2021 in Slovenian sport